Macrarene diegensis is a fossil species of small sea snail, a marine gastropod mollusk in the family Liotiidae.

Description
The height of the shell attains 20 mm, its diameter 25 mm. The narrowly umbilicated shell contains 4 whorls with distinct sutures and a projecting peripheral keel. The oblique aperture is circular. Its color is chalky white. This fossil species shows some similarities with Macrarene coronadoensis and Macrarene californica.

Distribution
This species is known only as a fossil. It is found in the San Diego Formation, California, and dates from the Pliocene.

References

diegensis
Gastropods described in 1964